Sergestoidea is a superfamily of prawns, divided into two families – the Luciferidae and the Sergestidae.

References

Dendrobranchiata